Texas Health Arlington Memorial, formerly Arlington Memorial Hospital, is a full-service acute-care medical center located in Arlington, Texas (US) with 369 licensed beds. It is a part of the Texas Health Resources medical system. Its fragility fracture program was the first such program to receive Joint Commission certification.

References

Hospital buildings completed in 1958
Hospitals in Texas